Levon Helm and the RCO All-Stars is a 1977 album by the short-lived musical group of the same name. It was Levon Helm's first studio album independent of The Band.

Track listing
 "Washer Woman" (Mac Rebennack)
 "The Tie That Binds" (Mac Rebennack, Bobby Charles Guidry)
 "You Got Me" (Booker T. Jones)
 "Blues So Bad" (Henry Glover, Levon Helm)
 "Sing, Sing, Sing (Let's Make a Better World)" (Earl King)
 "Milk Cow Boogie" (Kokomo Arnold)  (Traditional; arranged by Levon Helm and Donald Dunn)
 "Rain Down Tears" (Henry Glover, Rudy Toombs)
 "A Mood I Was In" (Fred Carter, Jr.)
 "Havana Moon" (Chuck Berry)
 "That's My Home" (Traditional; arranged by Levon Helm and Mac Rebennack)

Personnel
 Levon Helm – lead vocals, backing vocals, drums
 Emmaretta Marks – backing vocals
 Jeannette Baker – backing vocals
 John Flamingo – backing vocals
 Alan Rubin – trumpet
 Tom Malone – trombone
 Lou Marini – saxophone
 Howard Johnson – baritone saxophone, tuba
 Paul Butterfield – harmonica, backing vocals
 Fred Carter Jr. – guitars
 Steve Cropper – guitars
 Booker T. Jones – keyboards, percussion
 Mac Rebennack – keyboards, backing vocals, guitars, percussion
 Donald Dunn – bass
 Charles Miller – baritone saxophone (track 5)
 Jesse Ehrlich – strings (track 5)
 Louis Kievman – strings (track 5)
 Sid Sharp – strings (track 5)
 William Kurasch – strings (track 5)
 Robbie Robertson – guitar (track 5)
 Garth Hudson – accordion (track 5)
 Henry Glover – "Band Master"

Technical
Recorded by Eddie Offord

References

1977 debut albums
Levon Helm albums
ABC Records albums
Albums recorded at Shangri-La (recording studio)